Essex Airport  is located  southwest of Essex, Ontario, Canada.

References

Essex, Ontario
Registered aerodromes in Essex County, Ontario